Yorkshire County Cricket Club was established on 8 January 1863; prior to that an informal county organisation had existed before, and had occasionally appeared in first-class cricket, typically playing as Sheffield. It has since played first-class cricket from 1863, List A cricket from 1963 and Twenty20 cricket from 2003, using a different number of home grounds during that time. Great Horton Road in Bradford played host to the club's inaugural home first-class fixture in 1863 against Nottinghamshire, while a century later its first home List A fixture was played at Acklam Park in Middlesbrough against the same opponents, and forty years later the club's first home Twenty20 fixture was played at Headingley against Derbyshire. Yorkshire have played home matches at 21 grounds, but today play the majority of their home fixtures at Headingley, which also holds Test, One Day International and Twenty20 International cricket matches. The club's original home ground at Bramall Lane also held one Test match in 1902.

The 23 grounds that Yorkshire have used for home matches since 1863 are listed below, with statistics complete through to the end of the 2014 season.

Grounds
Below is a complete list of grounds used by Yorkshire County Cricket Club in first-class, List A and Twenty20 matches.

Notes

References

Yorkshire County Cricket Club
Cricket grounds in Yorkshire
Yorkshire
Yorkshire-related lists